The traditional music of Jordan has a long history. Rural zajal songs, with improvised poetry played with a mijwiz, tablah, arghul, oud, rabab, and reed pipe ensemble accompanying is popular. The transition of old cultural music into hit pop songs known worldwide  
Recently, Jordan has seen the rise of prominent DJs and popstars.

Traditional Jordanian musical instruments 

Jordanian music has a diversity and a range of components that makes it a popular art. Over the centuries music has evolved and so did its instruments. Jordanian music comes with variety of instruments.
 Flute \ reed pipe known as Shababa
 Mijwiz
 Arghul known as Yarghul
 Oud
 Tablah
 Rebab
 Al-Mihbash
 Bagpipes known as Gerbeh
 Riq
 Daf
 Simsimiyya, found in the port city of Aqaba and the southern desert

Popular music

Generally there are two types of Jordanian music, both of which have unique platform and various tracks. 
The cheer/fun/happy cultural songs and strong meaning patriotic songs. Over the years, new varieties of singers and composers have emerged. 

Jordan’s music formed from the strong Bedouin and sub Arabian area. It has a diversity and variety of elements which creates a unique platform.
Jordanian bands and artists are taking a blend of Arab-Western electronic pop to the world stage. Over the years, a new variety of singers and composers have emerged. Over the past decades artist such as Diana karazoon and others were the most popular among the mass audience, in mid 2000's indie bands such as JadaL and others emerged and found fair amount of success amongst the youth in Jordan and the region. The Bedouin singer Omar Al-Abdallat (known for his patriotic song "Hashemi, Hashemi"), Diana Karazon (winner of the Arab version of Pop Idol), Toni Qattan, and singer Hani Mitwasi (the winner of the Jordan Awards 2010) are perhaps Jordan's biggest stars. Other well-known Jordanian musicians are Qamar Badwan (who won the golden prize in the 2000 Cairo Song Festival), and percussionist Hani Naser.

A new age group called Rum has gained popularity since its inception in 1998. 

In Amman, the capital of Jordan, there has been a movement of alternative music in the last decades. Rock bands that mix western and eastern influences are becoming more popular. Rock and underground bands in the late 1990s and early 2000 were known for mixing oriental with rock or jazz music.

The alternative Jordanian music scene flourished with bands such as JadaL (2003), Autostrad (band) (2007), Akher Zapheer (2007),  El Morabba3 (2008), Aziz Maraka, and others.

Arabic hip hop and Arabic rap artists in Jordan have added to the musical scene. These artists includes names like El Far3i, and Torabyeh.

Jordan also has an underground heavy metal scene with bands such as Bilocate (doom/death metal),  and Ajdath, who currently reside in Poland. Other bands, like Augury (black metal) and Darkcide (doom/death metal) had to stop due to lack of support or to band members leaving the country.

Some of the musicians in Jordan are the Faqir family, which extends back for more than 100 years. Jordan's western radio station, Play 99.6, works towards exposing new local artists, including many western pop singers. And of various industries and music genres, the number of female musicians and composers of Jordanian nationality is growing. Some are: Hana Malhas, Ruba Saqr, Sahar Khalifeh, Suad Lakišić Bushnaq, and Zeina Azouqah.

The indie rock scene was achieved thanks to artists such as Ibrahim Baggili and Hani Mitwasi. Other genres in Jordan are hip hop.

A classical composer Zade Dirani, an internationally known composer and pianist, releasing his newest album named Mediterrani.

See also

Tawfiq Al-Nimri

References

 Badley, Bill, and Zein al Jundi. "Europe Meets Asia". 2000. In Broughton, Simon and Ellingham, Mark with McConnachie, James and Duane, Orla (Ed.), World Music, Vol. 1: Africa, Europe and the Middle East, pp 391–395. Rough Guides Ltd, Penguin Books.

External links
 Sakher Hattar's Music From Jordan Playlist on Youtube
 BBC Radio 3 Audio (60 minutes): The Bedouin. Accessed November 25, 2010.
 BBC Radio 3 Audio (60 minutes): Amman: Ilham Al madfai, Toni Qattan and Shou Al Ayam. Accessed November 25, 2010.
 BBC Radio 3 Audio (60 minutes): Jordan – Amman: Ilham Al Madfai. Accessed November 25, 2010.
 Jordanian songs 
 JadaL band
 Kais Khoury .external'
 JORavers.com 
 http://www.joravers.com

Jordanian music
Jordanian culture
Asian music
Arabic music